Lisa Raymond and Rennae Stubbs were the defending champions, but Stubbs decided not to participate.
Raymond played alongside Liezel Huber, but defeated 1st seed Květa Peschke and Katarina Srebotnik them  6–3, 6–0 in the final.

Seeds

Draw

Draw

External links
 Main draw

Aegon International - Doubles
Doubles